Bernardino de Cárdenas y Portugal (Torrijos, 20 January 1553 – Palermo, 17 December 1601), 3rd Duke of Maqueda, 2nd Marquis of Elche, was a Spanish noble and statesman. 

He was the son of Bernardino de Cárdenas y Pacheco, 2nd Duke of Maqueda, 1st Marquis of Elche, and of Isabel de Velasco, daughter of Íñigo Fernández de Velasco, 2nd Duke of Frías, Constable of Castile. 

He was viceroy of Catalonia and of Sicily.

He married Luisa Manrique de Lara, 5th Duchess of Nájera and had 4 sons and 2 daughters.
He was succeeded by his eldest surviving son Jorge de Cárdenas y Manrique de Lara.V

External links 
 Ducado de Maqueda.

Viceroys of Catalonia
Viceroys of Sicily
Marquesses of Spain
Dukes of Spain
1553 births
1601 deaths